Bowman is a surname. Notable people with the surname include:

Arts and entertainment
 Abie Philbin Bowman, Irish columnist and comedian
 Charles Sumner Bowman (1873–?), African-American architect, educator, and director of a university department
 Edith Bowman (born 1974), Scottish radio DJ
 Euday L. Bowman (1887–1949), American musician
 Fallon Bowman (born 1983 ), Canadian guitarist
 Jan Bowman (born 1953), Australian basketball player
 Jessica Bowman (born 1980), American actress
 Joe Bowman (marksman) (1925–2009), American marksman and Wild West show entertainer
 Josh Bowman (born 1988), British actor
 Lee Bowman (1914–1979), American actor
 Leslie Greene Bowman (born 1956), American art curator and museum administrator
 Raymond D. Bowman, (1917–2001) American music critic
 Rob Bowman (director), (born 1960) American film maker
 Steve Bowman, (born 1967) American musician

Military
 Alexander Hamilton Bowman (1803–1865), United States Army engineer of Fort Sumter
 Alfred Connor Bowman (1904 – 1982) American lawyer and military leader
 Alonzo Bowman (1848–1885), United States Army Medal of Honor recipient
 Isaac Bowman (1757–1826), American soldier and Kentucky pioneer
 Joseph Bowman (c. 1752–1779), American Revolutionary War officer and Kentucky pioneer
 Robert M. Bowman (1934–2013), American Air Force officer and anti-Strategic Defense Initiative activist
 Thaddeus Bowman (1743–1806), American militia scout in the American Revolutionary War

Pioneers
 Abraham Bowman (1749–1837), Kentucky pioneer
 Nathaniel Bowman (1608–1682), first Bowman family immigrant to settle in the Massachusetts Bay colony
 William Bowman (miller) (c. 1811–1894), pioneer in South Australia
 Bowman brothers, 19th century pioneer pastoralists of Tasmania and South Australia

Politics
 Alexander Bowman (Irish politician) (c. 1854–1924), Irish politician and trade unionist
 Alexander Bowman (Australian politician) (1838–1892), Australian politician, son of George
 Bill Bowman (American politician) (1946–2020), American politician
 Charles Calvin Bowman (1852–1941), U.S. Representative from Pennsylvania
 Frank Llewellyn Bowman (1879–1936), U.S. Representative from West Virginia
 George Bowman (Australian politician) (1795–1878), Australian politician, brother of William
 Jamaal Bowman (born 1976), American educator and politician from New York
 Victoria Jane Bowman (born 12 June 1966), short Vicky Bowman, a former British diplomat 
 William Bowman (Australian politician) (1799–1874), Australian politician, brother of George
 Woody Bowman (1941–2015), American politician

Science
 Isaiah Bowman (1878–1950), American geographer
 John Eddowes Bowman the Elder (1785–1841), British botanist and mycologist with the standard author abbreviation 'Bowman'
 John Eddowes Bowman the Younger (1819–1854), English chemist, son of John the Elder
 John Maxwell Bowman (1925–2005), Canadian physician and medical researcher
 Karl Bowman (1888–1973), psychiatrist and president of the American Psychiatric Association
 Sir William Bowman, 1st Baronet (1816–1892), British surgeon and anatomist

Sports
 Alex Bowman (born 1993), auto racing driver
 Bill Bowman (racing driver), NASCAR driver
 Braedon Bowman (born 1994), American football player
 Brandon Bowman (born 1984), American basketball player
 Christopher Bowman (1967–2008), American figure skater
 Drayson Bowman, (born 1989) American ice hockey player
 Elmer Bowman (1897–1985), American baseball player
 Ernie Bowman (1935–2019), American baseball player
 Harold Bowman (c. 1903–1957), English rugby player
 Herbert Bowman (1897–1980), American tennis player
 Ira Bowman (born 1973), American basketball player
 Jim Bowman (American football) (born 1963), American football player
 Kenneth Bowman (1937–2013), English rugby player
 Ky Bowman (born 1998), American basketball player
 Lisa Bowman (born 1988), Irish netball player
 NaVorro Bowman, (born 1988) American football player
 Paul Bowman (rugby league) (born 1976), Australian rugby player
 R. T. V. Bowman (1875–1899), American college baseball and football coach
 Ryan Bowman (born 1991), English footballer
 Scotty Bowman (born 1933), American hockey coach
 Stan Bowman (born 1973), American hockey manager
 Steve Bowman (American football) (born 1944), American football player
 Walter Bowman (soccer) (1870–1948) Canadian soccer player
 Zack Bowman (born 1984), American football player

Other
 Sarah A. Bowman (c. 1813–1866), Irish-American innkeeper, restaurateur and madam
 William N. Bowman (1868–1944), American architect
 Barbara T. Bowman (born 1928), American educator and co-founder of Chicago's Erikson Institute
 Carol Bowman (born 1950), American writer and therapist
 Christopher N. Bowman, American engineer
 Jonathan Philbin Bowman (1969–2000), Irish journalist and radio broadcaster
 Mary Bowman (1908–2002), American economist
 Rob Bowman (music writer) (born 1957), Canadian ethnomusicologist
 Sally Anne Bowman (1987–2005), British murder victim
 Thea Bowman (1937–1990), Roman Catholic religious sister and educator

Multiple
 Brian Bowman (disambiguation), various people
 David Bowman (disambiguation), various people
 Don Bowman (disambiguation), various people
 George Bowman (disambiguation)
 James Bowman (disambiguation)
 Joe Bowman (disambiguation)
 John Bowman (disambiguation), various people
 Robert Bowman (disambiguation), various people
 Thomas Bowman (disambiguation)

See also
 Bowman (disambiguation), including various places and organizations named after people with the surname

English-language surnames
Occupational surnames
English-language occupational surnames